Multan is a city in Punjab, Pakistan, on the bank of the Chenab River. Multan is Pakistan's seventh largest city as per the 2017 census, and the major cultural, religious and economic centre of southern Punjab. 

Multan is one of the oldest continuously inhabited cities in Asia, with a history stretching deep into antiquity. The ancient city was the site of the renowned Multan Sun Temple, and was besieged by Alexander the Great during the Mallian Campaign. A historic cultural centre of the wider Punjab, it was conquered by the Ummayad military commander Muhammad bin Qasim. The city later became independent as the capital of the Emirate of Multan in 855 A.D., before subsequently coming under the rule of empires such as the Ghaznavids, the Ghurids and the Mamluks. In 1445, it became capital of the Langah Sultanate. In 1526, it was conquered by the Mughal Empire. Multan Subah would become one of the largest provinces of the Mughal Empire when it was created by administrative reforms of Emperor Akbar. Afterwards,  Multan became part of the Durrani and Sikh empires successively. In 1848, it was conquered by the British Empire and became part of British Punjab. After independence, it became part of Pakistan.

Multan was one of the most important trading centres of the medieval Islamic Indian subcontinent, and attracted a multitude of Sufi mystics in the 11th and 12th centuries, earning the city the sobriquet "City of Saints." The city, along with the nearby city of Uch, is renowned for its large number of Sufi shrines dating from that era.

Etymology
The origin of Multan's name is unclear. An ancient known name of the city was Malli-istan; Malli was the name of a tribe that inhabited the region and city. Some have suggested the name derives from the Old Persian word mulastāna, 'frontier land', while others have ascribed its origin to the Sanskrit word mūlasthāna, which may be derived from the Hindu deity worshipped at the Multan Sun Temple. Hukm Chand in the 19th century suggested that the city was named after an ancient Hindu tribe called Malli or Mulu.

History

Origin
Multan was founded by the great grandson of the Prophet Noah according to the Persian historian Firishta. It is one of the oldest cities of South Asia and has been the site of much warfare because of its location on a major invasion route between South and Central Asia. The region has been continuously inhabited for at least 3,000 years, and is home to numerous archaeological sites dating to the era of the Early Harappan period of the Indus Valley civilisation from 3000 BCE until 2800 BCE. 

According to Hindu religious texts, Multan was founded by the Hindu sage Kashyapa. These tetxts also assert that Multan was the capital of the Trigarta Kingdom ruled by the Katoch dynasty during the Kurukshetra War that is central to the Hindu epic poem, the Mahabharata. The Hindu festival of Holi is generally assumed to have originated from the Prahladpuri Temple of Multan.

Ancient Multan was the centre of a solar-worshipping cult that was based at the ancient  Multan Sun Temple. While the tradition was dedicated to the Hindu Sun God Surya, the cult was influenced by Persian Zoroastrianism. The Sun Temple was mentioned by the Greek Admiral Skylax, who passed through the area in 515 BCE. The temple is also mentioned in the 400s BCE by the Greek historian Herodotus. Kaspatyrus or Kashyapura (an old name of Multan) was a Gandharan city when conquered by Darius's army, and it was subsequently included in the Province of Arachosia.

Greek Invasion

Multan is believed to have been the Malli capital that was conquered by Alexander the Great in 326 BCE as part of the Mallian Campaign. The Malli, together with nearby tribes, gathered an army of 90,000 personnel to fight against an army of 50,000 Greeks. This was the largest army faced by Greeks in the entire subcontinent. During the siege of the city's citadel, Alexander reputedly leaped into the inner area of the citadel, where he killed the Mallians' leader. Alexander was wounded by an arrow that had penetrated his lung, leaving him severely injured.  The Greek army thereafter started killing civilians and animals and whatever came in their way to take revenge of their injured leader. The Mallian army eventually surrendered, preventing further bloodshed. During Alexander's era, Multan was located on an island in the Ravi river, which has since shifted course numerous times throughout the centuries.

In the mid-5th century CE, the city was attacked by White Huns, a group of Barbarian Hephthalite nomads led by Toramana. After a fierce fight they conquered Multan, but did not stay long.

By the mid 7th century CE, Multan was conquered by Chach of Alor, of the Hindu Rai dynasty. Chach appointed a thakur to govern from Multan, and used his army to settle boundary disputes with Kashmir.

Islamic conquest

Multan was first visited by the Muslim army after the reign of the Khalifa Ali bin abi Talib, in 44 Hijri (664 A.D.), when Mohalib, the Arab General, afterwards an eminent commander in Persia and Arabia, who had fought in the service of Rashidun caliphs, penetrated to the ancient capital of the Malli. He returned with many prisoners of war. The expedition, however, seems to have been directed towards exploration of the country as no attempt was apparently made to retain the conquest.

Umayyad Conquest

After his conquest of Sindh, Muhammad ibn Qasim in 712 CE captured Multan from the local ruler Raja Dahir following a two-month siege.
Muhammad ibn Qasim's army was running out of supplies, but Multan's defenses were still holding strong. His army was considering a retreat when an unnamed Multani came to him and told him about an underground canal from which they derived their sustenance. He told them that if Muhammad's army were to block that canal, Multan would be under their control. Muhammad ibn Qasim blocked the canal and soon took control of Multan.
Following ibn Qasim's conquest, the city's subjects remained mostly non-Muslim for the next few decades under the Umayyad Caliphate.

Emirate of Multan

Abbasid Amirate

By the mid-800s, the Banu Munabbih (855–959) also known as the Banu Sama, who claimed descent from the Prophet Muhammad's Quraysh tribe came to rule Multan, and established the Amirate of Banu Munabbih, which ruled for the next century.

During this era, the Multan Sun Temple was noted by the 10th century Arab geographer Al-Muqaddasi to have been located in a most populous part of the city. The Hindu temple was noted to have accrued the Muslim rulers large tax revenues, by some accounts up to 30% of the state's revenues. During this time, the city's Arabic nickname was Faraj Bayt al-Dhahab, ("Frontier House of Gold"), reflecting the importance of the temple to the city's economy.

The 10th century Arab historian Al-Masudi noted Multan as the city where Central Asian caravans from Islamic Khorasan would assemble. The 10th century Persian geographer Estakhri noted that the city of Multan was approximately half the size of Sindh's capital Mansura, but had more population, which along with Multan were the only two Arab principalities in South Asia. Arabic was spoken in both cities, though the inhabitants of Multan were reported by Estakhri to also have been speakers of Persian, reflecting the importance of trade with Khorasan. Polyglossia rendered Multani merchants culturally well-suited for trade with the Islamic world.

The 10th century Hudud al-'Alam notes that Multan's rulers were also in control of Lahore, though that city was then lost to the Hindu Shahi. During the 10th century, Multan's rulers resided at a camp outside of the city named Jandrawār, and would enter Multan once a week on the back of an elephant for Friday prayers.

Ismaili Emirate

Multan became capital of Emirate of Multan in 855. Al Masudi of Baghdad who visited Indus valley in 915 A.D mentioned in his book "Meadows of Gold" that it is one of the strongest frontier places of Muslims and in its neighbourhood there are a hundred and twenty thousand towns and villages".

By the mid 10th century, Multan had come under the  influence of the Qarmatian Ismailis. The Qarmatians had been expelled from Egypt and Iraq following their defeat at the hands of the Abbasids there. Qarmatians zealots had famously sacked Mecca, and outraged the Muslim world with their theft and ransom of the Kaaba's Black Stone, and desecration of the Zamzam Well with corpses during the Hajj season of 930 CE.

The governor of Jhang, Umar bin Hafas, was a clandestine supporter of the Fatimid movement and the Batiniya influence spread in Southern Punjab. Then, the Qarmatians who had established contacts with the Fatimids in Egypt set up an independent dynasty in Multan and ruled the surrounding areas.

They wrested control of the city from the pro-Abbasid Amirate of Banu Munabbih, and established the Emirate of Multan, while pledging allegiance to the Ismaili Fatimid Dynasty based in Cairo.
During this period, Uch and Multan remained a central pilgrimage site for Vaishnavite and Surya devotees, and their admixture with Isma’īlīsm created the Satpanth tradition. Hence, the beginning of the eleventh century witnessed a sacral and political diversity in Uch that was both unique and precarious. The Qarmatian Ismailis opposed Hindu pilgrims worshipping the sun, and destroyed the Sun Temple and smashed its revered Aditya idol in the late 10th century. The Qarmatians built an Ismaili congregational mosque above the ruins to replace the city's Sunni congregational mosque that had been established by the city's early rulers.

Medieval

Ghaznavid dynasty

Mahmud of Ghazni in 1005 led an expedition against Multan's Qarmatian ruler Abul Fateh Daud. The city was surrendered, and Fateh Daud was permitted to retain control over the city with the condition that he adhere to Sunnism. In 1007, Mahmud led another expedition to Multan against his former minister and Hindu convert, Niwasa Khan, who had renounced Islam and attempted to establish control of the region in collusion with Abul Fateh Daud of Multan.

In 1010, Mahmud led his third and punitive expedition against Daud to depose and imprison him, and suppressed Ismailism in favour of the Sunni creed. He destroyed the Ismaili congregational mosque that had been built above the ruins of the Multan Sun Temple, and restored the city's old Sunni congregational mosque, built by Muhammad bin Qasim.

The 11th century scholar Abu Mansur al-Baghdadi  reported that thousands of Ismailis were killed or mutilated during Mahmud's invasion, though the community was not extinguished. Mahmud's rule over the region was noted by Al-Biruni to have ruined the region's former prosperity. Following the Ghaznavid invasion of Multan, the local Ismaili community split, with one faction aligning themselves with the Druze religion, which today survives in Lebanon, Syria, and the Golan Heights. Following Mahmud's death in 1030, Multan regained its independence from the Ghaznavid empire and came under the sway of Ismaili rule once again. Shah Gardez, who came to Multan in 1088, is said to have contributed in the restoration of the city.

By the early 1100s, Multan was described by the Arab geographer Muhammad al-Idrisi as being a "large city" commanded by a citadel that was surrounded by a moat. In the early 12th century, Multani poet Abdul Rahman penned the Sandesh Rasak, the only known Muslim work in the medieval Apabhraṃśa language.

Ghurid dynasty

In 1175, Muhammad Ghori conquered Ismaili-ruled Multan, after having invaded the region via the Gomal Pass from Afghanistan into Punjab, and used the city as a springboard for his unsuccessful campaign into Gujarat in 1178. Multan was then annexed to the Ghurid Sultanate, and became an administrative province of the Mamluk Dynasty — the first dynasty of the Delhi Sultanate. Multan's Ismaili community rose up in an unsuccessful rebellion against the Ghurids later in 1175. According to Shah Gardez, the second invasion of Multan lead to the extinguishment of the remnants of Ismailism in the region.

Mamluk dynasty
Following the death of the first Mumluk Sultan, Qutb al-Din Aibak in 1210, Multan came under the rule of Nasiruddin Qabacha, who in 1222, successfully repulsed an attempted invasion by Sultan Jalal ad-Din Mingburnu of the Khwarazmian Empire, whose origins were rooted in Konye-Urgench in modern-day Turkmenistan. Uch and Sindh were also in control of Qabacha.

Qabacha also captured Lahore many times and ruled all these regions. He repulsed a 40-day siege imposed on Multan city by Mongol forces who attempted to conquer the city. He gathered a large army from Uch, Multan and Bukkhar (Sukkur) and Mongols were repulsed.

Following Qabacha's death that same year, the Turkic king Iltutmish, the third Sultan of the Mamluk dynasty, captured and then annexed Multan in an expedition. The Punjabi poet Baba Farid was born in the village of Khatwal near Multan in the 1200s.

Qarlughids attempted to invade Multan in 1236, while the Mongols tried to capture the city in 1241 after capturing Lahore - though they were repulsed. The Mongols under Sali Noyan then successfully held the city to ransom in 1245–6, before being recaptured by Sultan Ghiyas ud din Balban, the ninth Mamluk Sultan. Multan then fell to the Qarlughids in 1249, but was captured by Sher Khan that same year. Multan was then conquered by Izz al-Din Balban Kashlu Khan in 1254, before he rebelled against Sultan Ghiyas ud din Balban in 1257 and fled to Iraq where he joined Mongol forces and captured Multan again, and dismantled its city walls. The Mongols again attempted an invasion in 1279, but were dealt a decisive defeat.

Khaljis dynasty

Emperor Alauddin Khalji of Delhi dispatched his brother Ulugh Khan in 1296 to conquer Multan in order to eliminate surviving family members of his predecessor. (Sultan Jalal-ud-din Khalji)

After usurping the throne of Delhi, Alauddin decided to eliminate the surviving family members of Jalaluddin, who were present in Multan. In November 1296, he sent a 30,000-40,000 strong army led by Ulugh Khan and Zafar Khan to Multan, which was governed by Jalaluddin's son Arkali Khan. Faced with a certain defeat, the leaders of the defending forces deserted Arkali Khan and defected to the Delhi forces after two months of siege.

Amir Khusrau, the famous Indo-Persian sufi singer, musician, poet and scholar visited Multan on the invitation of Khan Muhammad. Multan at the time was the gateway to India and was a center of knowledge and learning. Caravans of scholars, tradesmen and emissaries transited through Multan from Baghdad, Arabia and Persia on their way to Delhi. Khusrau wrote that:

I tied the belt of service on my waist and put on the cap of companionship for another five years. I imparted lustre to the water of Multan from the ocean of my wits and pleasantries.

Tughluq dynasty

In the 1320s Multan was conquered by Ghiyath al-Din Tughluq, he was made the governor of Multan and South Punjab, Sindh regions and of Depalpur. He was the founder of the Turkic Tughluq dynasty, the third dynasty of the Delhi Sultanate. Earlier he spent his time in Multan and fought 28 battles against Mongols from there and saved the regions from advances of Mongols. He wrote in the jamia Masjid of Multan that he had fought 28 battles against Mongols and had survived, people gave him the title Ghazi ul Mulk.

Ghiyath al din's son Muhammad bin Tughlaq was born in Multan. After Ghiyath's death he became the Sultan and ascended the throne in Delhi. The countryside around Multan was recorded to have been devastated by excessively high taxes imposed during the reign of Ghiyath's son, Muhammad Tughluq. In 1328, the Governor of Multan, Kishlu Khan, rose in rebellion against Muhammad Tughluq, but was quickly defeated.

The Tomb of Shah Rukn-e-Alam was completed during the Tughluq era, and is considered to be the first Tughluq monument. The shrine is believed to have been originally built to be the tomb of Ghiyath ad-Din, but was later donated to the descendants of Rukn-e-Alam after Ghiyath became Emperor of Delhi.

The renowned Arab explorer Ibn Battuta visited Multan in the 1300s during the reign of Muhammad Tughluq, and noted that Multan was a trading centre for horses imported from as far away as the Russian Steppe. Multan had also been noted to be a centre for slave-trade, though slavery was banned in the late 1300s by Muhammad Tughluq's son, Firuz Shah Tughlaq.

Timurid dynasty

In 1397, Multan was besieged by Tamerlane's grandson Pir Muhammad. Pir Muhammad's forces captured the city in 1398 following the conclusion of the 6 month-long siege. Khizr Khan the governor of Multan allied with Amir Timur. Timur captured Lahore and gave its control to Khizr khan as reward for his support. Also in 1398, the elder Tamerlane and Multan's Governor Khizr Khan together sacked Delhi. The sack of Delhi lead to major disruptions of the Sultanate's central governing structure. Khizr Khan ruled the subcontinent on the name of Timur. In 1414, Multan's Khizr Khan captured Delhi from Daulat Khan Lodi, and established the short-lived Sayyid dynasty — the fourth dynasty of the Delhi Sultanate.

A contemporary writer Yahya Sirhindi mentions in his Takhrikh-i-Mubarak Shahi that Khizr Khan was a descendant of prophet Muhammad.

Langah Sultanate

Multan then passed to the Langah, who established the Langah Sultanate in Multan under the rule of Budhan Khan, who assumed the title Mahmud Shah. The reign of Shah Husayn, grandson of Mahmud Shah, who ruled from 1469 to 1498 is considered to most illustrious of the Langah Sultans. Multan experienced prosperity during this time, and a large number of Baloch settlers arrived in the city at the invitation of Shah Husayn. The Sultanate's borders stretched encompassed the neighbouring regions surrounding the cities of Chiniot and Shorkot, near modern day Faisalabad. Shah Husayn successfully repulsed attempted invasion by the Delhi Sultans led by Tatar Khan and Barbak Shah.

Multan's Langah Sultanate came to an end in 1525 when the city was invaded by rulers of the Arghun dynasty, who were either ethnic Mongols, or of Turkic or Turco-Mongol extraction.

Suri dynasty

In 1541, the Pashtun king Sher Shah Suri captured Multan, and successfully defended the city from the advances of the Mughal Emperor Humayun. In 1543, Sher Shah Suri expelled Baloch dynasty, who under the command of Fateh Khan Mirrani had overrun the city. Following its recapture, Sher Shah Suri ordered construction of a road between Lahore and Multan in order to connect Multan to his massive Grand Trunk Road project. Sher Shah Suri also built (or renovated) Delhi-Multan road, the ancient trade route had existed since the time of King Ashoka or earlier. In order to improve transit in the areas between Delhi and Multan, leading to Kandahar and Herat in Afghanistan, eventually to Mashhad capital of Khorasan province of Iran. It then served as the starting point for trade caravans from medieval India departing towards West Asia.

Medieval trade

Multan served as medieval Islamic India's trans-regional mercantile centre for trade with the Islamic world. It rose as an important trading and mercantile centre in the setting of political stability offered by the Delhi Sultanate, the Lodis, and Mughals. The renowned Arab explorer Ibn Battuta visited Multan in the 1300s during the reign of Muhammad Tughluq, and noted that Multan was a trading centre for horses imported from as far away as the Russian Steppe. Multan had also been noted to be a centre for slave-trade, though slavery was banned in the late 1300s by Muhammad Tughluq's son, Firuz Shah Tughlaq.

The extent of Multan's influence is also reflected in the construction of the Multani Caravanserai in Baku, Azerbaijan — which was built in the 15th to house Multani merchants visiting the city. Legal records from the Uzbek city of Bukhara note that Multani merchants settled and owned land in the city in the late 1550s.

Multan would remain an important trading centre until the city was ravaged by repeated invasions in the 18th and 19th centuries in the post-Mughal era. Many of Multan's merchants then migrated to Shikarpur in Sindh, and were found throughout Central Asia up until the 19th century.

Mughal period

Following the conquest of Upper Sindh by the Mughal Emperor Akbar, Multan was attacked and captured by Akbar's army under the command of Bairam Khan in 1557, thereby re-establishing Mughal rule in Multan. The Mughals controlled the Multani region from 1524 until around 1739. Padshah (emperor) Akbar established province of Multan at Multan city, which was one of his original twelve subahs (imperial top-level provinces) roughly covering southern Punjab and bordering Kabul Subah, Lahore Subah, Ajmer Subah, Thatta Subah, and the Persian Safavid empire. It was one of Mughal Empire's largest provinces.

In 1627, Multan was encircled by walls that were built on the order of Murad Baksh, son of Shah Jahan. Upon his return from an expedition to Balkh in 1648, the future emperor Aurangzeb was appointed Governor of provinces of Multan and Sindh — a post he held until 1652.

In 1680, the renowned Punjabi poet, Bulleh Shah, who is regarded as a saint by both Sufis and Sikhs, was born in Uch, Multan province.

In the second half of the 17th century, Multan's commercial fortunes were adversely affected by silting and shifting of the nearby river, which denied traders vital trade access to the Arabian Sea. Multan witnessed difficult times as the Mughal Empire waned in power following the death of Emperor Aurangzeb in 1707.

Dar al-Aman era
Under Mughal rule, Multan enjoyed 200 years of peace in a time when the city became known as Dar al-Aman ("Abode of Peace"). During the Mughal era, Multan was an important centre of agricultural production and manufacturing of cotton textiles. Multan was a centre for currency minting, as well as tile-making during the Mughal era.

Multan was also host to the offices of many commercial enterprises during the Mughal era, even in times when the Mughals were in control of the even more coveted city of Kandahar, given the unstable political situation resulting from frequent contestation of Kandadar with the Persian Safavid Empire.

Afsharid invasion
Nader Shah conquered the region as part of his invasion of the Mughal Empire in 1739. Despite invasion, Multan remained northwest India's premier commercial centre throughout most of the 18th century.

Durrani and Maratha invasions
In 1752 Ahmad Shah Durrani captured Multan, the city which was also his birthplace, and the city's walls were rebuilt in 1756 by Nawab Ali Mohammad Khan Khakwani, who also built the Ali Muhammad Khan Mosque in 1757. In 1758, the Marathas under Raghunathrao briefly seized Multan, though the city was recaptured by Durrani in 1760. After repeated invasions following the collapse of the Mughal Empire, Multan was reduced from being one of the world's most important early-modern commercial centres, to a regional trading city.

Sikh empire
In 1772, Ahmed Shah Durrani's son Timur Shah lost Multan to Sikh forces. However, Multan's association with Sikhism predates this, as the founder of the Sikh religion, Guru Nanak, is said to have visited the city during one of his journeys.

The city had reverted to Afghan rule under the suzerainty of Nawab Muzaffar Khan in 1778. In 1817, Ranjit Singh sent a body of troops to Multan under the command of Diwan Bhiwani Das to receive from Nawab Muzaffar Khan the tribute he owed to the Sikh Darbar. In 1818, the armies of Kharak Singh and Misr Diwan Chand lay around Multan without making much initial headway, until Ranjit Singh dispatched the massive Zamzama cannon, which quickly led to disintegration of the Multan's defences. Misr Diwan Chand led Sikh armies to a decisive victory over Muzaffar Khan. Muzzafar Khan and seven of his sons were killed before the Multan fort finally fell on 2 March 1818 in the Battle of Multan.

The conquest of Multan established Ranjit Singh's superiority over the Afghans and ended their influence in this part of the Punjab. Diwan Sawan Mal Chopra was appointed to govern the city, remaining in his post for the following 25 years. Following the Sikh conquest, Multan declined in importance as a trading post, however the population of Multan rose from approximately 40,000 in 1827 to 60,000 by 1831. Sawan Mal adopted a policy of low taxation which generated immense land revenues for the state treasury. Following the death of Ranjit Singh, he ceased paying tribute to a successor and instead maintained alliances of convenience with selected Sikh aristocrats. He was assassinated in 1844, and succeeded by his son Diwan Mulraj Chopra, who unlike his father was seen as a despotic ruler by the local inhabitants.

1848 Multan Revolt

The 1848 Multan Revolt and subsequent Siege of Multan began on 19 April 1848 when local Sikhs loyal to Diwan Mulraj Chopra murdered two emissaries of the British Raj, Vans Agnew and Lieutenant Anderson. The two British visitors were in Multan to attend a ceremony for Sardar Kahan Singh, who had been selected by the British East India Company to replace Diwan Mulraj Chopra as ruler of Multan.

Rebellion engulfed the Multan region under the leadership of Mulraj Chopra and Sher Singh Attariwalla. The Multan Revolt triggered the start of the Second Anglo-Sikh War, during which the sajjada nashin of the Shrine of Bahauddin Zakariya sided with the British to help defeat the Sikh rebels. The revolt eventually resulted in the fall of the Sikh Empire in 1849.

British Raj

By December 1848, the British had captured portions of Multan city's outskirts, and destroyed the Multan Fort while bombarding the city. In January 1849, the British had amassed a force of 12,000 to conquer Multan. On 22 January 1849, the British had breached the walls of the Multan Fort, leading to the surrender of Mulraj and his forces to the British. The British conquest of the Sikh Empire was completed in February 1849, after the British victory at the Battle of Gujrat. Between the 1890s and 1920s, the British laid a vast network of canals in the Multan region, and throughout much of central and Southern Punjab province. Thousands of "Canal Towns" and villages were built according to standardized plans throughout the newly irrigated swathes of land.

Modern

Multan lost its very important position as soon as the British stronghold over the sub-continent grew stronger and stronger. Although peace prevailed in the region but no real progress was made. When independence was achieved in 1947 Multan was a forgotten region. The site of the Old Fort was in ruins. Thorny bushes and ditches were in plenty whispering the awful tale of its ruination. Majority of the roads were unmetalled and the sewerage system too defective to explain.

The predominantly Muslim population supported Muslim League and Pakistan Movement. After the independence of Pakistan in 1947, the minority Hindus and Sikhs migrated to India en masse, while some Muslim refugees from the newly independent Republic of India settled in the city. Today, it is one of the country's six largest urban centres and remains an important settlement in the Southern Punjab.

Geography

Topography
The nearest important cities are Dera Ghazi Khan and Bahawalpur. Multan is located in a bend created by five rivers of central Pakistan. The Sutlej River separates it from Bahawalpur and the Chenab River from Muzaffar Garh. The area around the city is a flat, alluvial plain surrounded by orchards and deserts that is used for citrus and mango farms.

Climate

Multan features a hot desert climate (Köppen climate classification BWh) with extremely hot summers and mild winters. The normal annual precipitation measures .

Multan is known for having some of the hottest weather in Pakistan.

Multan's climate is primarily influenced by:

Western Disturbances which generally occurs during the winter months between December and February. The Western Disturbance provokes moderate rainfall, with hailstorms also sometimes occurring.
Deforestation, dust storms occur during summer months. The region has seen large scale deforestation in last decades resulting in dust storms. Multan's dust storm sometimes produce violent wind.
Heat waves occur during the hottest months of May and June, and can result in temperatures approaching 50° Celsius (122° Fahrenheit)
South West Monsoon occurs following the hottest months of the year, and lasts between June and September. Monsoon rains moderate temperatures, and can sometimes produce heavy rain storms.
Continental air prevails during the remaining months generally yields clear weather with little to no precipitation.

Cityscape

Multan's urban typology is similar to other ancient cities in South Asia, such as Peshawar, Lahore, and Delhi - all of which were founded near a major river, and included an old walled city, as well as a royal citadel. Unlike those cities, Multan has lost its royal citadel, as it was largely destroyed by the British in 1848, which negatively impacted the urban fabric of the city.

Multan's old neighbourhood homes exemplify Muslim concerns regarding privacy, and defense against the city's harsh climate. The urban morphology is characterized by small and private cul-de-sacs branching off of bazaars and larger arteries.

A distinct Multani style of architecture began taking root in the 14th century with the establishment of funerary monuments, and is characterized by large brick walls reinforced by wooden anchors, with inward sloping roofs. Funerary architecture is also reflected in the city's residential quarters, which borrow architectural and decorative elements from Multan's mausolea.

Demographics

Multan city had a population of 1,078,245 in the 1998 census. As of 2017 census, Multan's population jumped to 1.827 million. Multan had a sex ratio of 950 females per 1000 males and a literacy rate of 74.69%: 77.50% for males and 71.74% for females. 440,112 (24.09%) were under 10 years of age.

Language
At the time of the 2017 census, 42.10% of the population spoke Saraiki, 29.25% Punjabi, 26.77% Urdu and 1.18% Pashto as their first language.

Religion 
Islam is the predominant religion, with 98.99% of the population and 0.86% Christian. 1,728 are Hindus and 104 Sikhs.

Civic Administration
Administrators who are government servants have the powers of Nazims (Mayor). Multan district is spread over an area of 3,721 square kilometres, comprising four tehsils: Multan City, Multan Saddar, Shujabad and Jalalpur Pirwala. In 2005 Multan was reorganised as a City District composed of six autonomous towns:

 Bosan
 Shah Rukan e Alam
 Mumtazabad
 Sher Shah
 Shujabad
 Jalalpur Pirwala
Area under Multan Development Authority (MDA) is 560km square, covering almost all important establishments like BZU, Pak Arab fertilizers and industrial estate etc. In 2022 MDA increased its metropolitan area limit from 280 Km square to 560 Km square adding an extra population of 375,000 with grand total population of 2.2 million making the city 4th most populous city of Pakistan.

Residential areas

 Shah Rukan e Alam
 Multan Cantt
 Shah Faisal Colony
 Gulgasht Colony
 Zakariya Town

Transportation

Motorways
Multan is connected to operational motorways M4 on northside connecting to Faisalabad and M5 on south side connecting Sukkar. M4 is further connected to M3 connecting Lahore and M2 connecting Islamabad and Peshawar to Multan. While M5 will be connecting to Karachi via Karachi-Lahore Motorway in future.

Multan is situated along the under-construction 6-lane Karachi–Lahore Motorway (M3) connecting Southern and northern Pakistan that is being built as part of the $54 billion China Pakistan Economic Corridor. Currently, Lahore to Multan travel time is 4 hours on motorway M3 and M4. The 6-lane, 392 kilometre long M-5 section of the motorway is built between Sukkur and Multan at a cost $2.89 billion. The M-5 is open since 2019. It is connecting Multan to Sukkar and will connect to Karachi when Sukkar-Karachi Motorway will be opened.

Multan is also connected to the city of Faisalabad via the M-4 motorway, which in turn is connected to the M-1 and M-2 motorways that provide access to Islamabad and Peshawar. Further links with the Karakoram Highway will provide access to Xinjiang, China, and Central Asia.

Construction of the M3 motorway also at a cost of approximately $1.5 billion, and was launched in November 2015 The motorway is branch off of the M-4 motorway and connects Lahore to the M-4 at Abdul Hakeem. The M4 is now operational.

Rail

Multan is connected by rail with all parts of the country and lies on the main track between Karachi, Peshawar, Lahore and Quetta. The Main Line-1 Railway that links Karachi and Peshawar passes through Multan district is being overhauled as part of the China Pakistan Economic Corridor. As part of the project, railways will be upgraded to permit train travel at speeds of up to 160 kilometres per hour, versus the average 60 to 105 km per hour speed currently possible on existing track, The project is divided into three phases, with the Peshawar to Multan portion to be completed as part of the project's first phase by 2018, and the entire project is expected to be complete by 2021.

From Multan, links to Khanewal, Lodhran and Muzafargarh are offered by rail. Multan Cantonment railway station is the main railway station of Multan.

Bus rapid transit (Metro Bus)

The Multan Metrobus is a bus rapid transit line which commenced service in January 2017, at a cost of 28.8 billion rupees. The BRT route serves 21 stations over the course of 18.5 kilometres, of which 12.5 kilometres are elevated. 14 stations are elevated, while the remainder are at street level. The BRT route begins at Bahauddin Zakariya University in northern Multan, and heads southward to pass by the eastern edge of Multan's old city at the Daulat Gate before turning east to finally terminate at the Kumharanwala Chowk in eastern Multan.

The route will be served initially by 35 buses, serving up to 95,000 passengers per day (or less than this but mostly students are using it). The Multan Metrobus is planned to ultimately have total of 4 BRT lines covering 68.82 kilometres, which will be complemented by feeder lines.

Air

Multan International Airport is located 10 km west of Multan's city centre, in the Multan Cantonment. The airport offers flights throughout Pakistan, as well as to the Persian Gulf States.

In March 2015, a new terminal building was formally inaugurated by Pakistani Prime Minister Nawaz Sharif. Following the opening of the new terminal, passenger traffic soared from 384,571 in 2014–2015, to 904,865 in 2015–2016.

Education

Bahauddin Zakariya University (formerly known as Multan University) is the main source of higher education for this region.

Other universities include Muhammad Nawaz Shareef University of Agriculture Multan, Air University Multan Campus, the NFC Institute of Engineering and Technology, Nishat School and College Nishtar Medical University, Multan Public School, Multan Medical and Dental College, Institute of Southern Punjab, and Women University Multan. In July 2021, Pakistan opened its first ever government-run school for transgender students in the city of Multan.

Heritage

Prahladpuri Temple

The Prahladpuri Temple is located on top of a raised platform inside the Fort of Multan, adjacent to tomb of Hazrat Baha’ul Haq Zakariya. A mosque has been subsequently built adjacent to temple.

The original temple of Prahladpuri is said to have been built by Prahlad, son of Hiranyakashipu, the king of Multan (Kashya-papura) in honor of Narsing Avatar, an incarnation of Hindu god Vishnu, who emerged from the pillar to save Prahlada.

Notable saints of Multan

 Shah Yousaf Gardezi (d. 1136), tomb located inner Bohar Gate Multan
 Mai Maharban (11/12th Century), tomb located near Chowk Fawara, children complex Multan
 Bahauddin Zakariya (1170–1267), tomb located in Multan Fort
 Makhdoom Abdul Rasheed Haqani (1170 - 1260), tomb located in Makhdoom Rasheed Multan
 Shah Rukne Alam (1251–1335), tomb located in Multan Fort
 Khawaja Awais Kagha (d. 1300)3, tomb located in Dera Basti graveyard Multan
 Syed Musa Pak (d. 1592)
 Hafiz Muhammad Jamal Multani (1747–1811)
 Syed Ata Ullah Shah Bukhari (1892–1961), buried in Jalal Bakri
 Syed Noor ul Hassan Bukhari (1902-1983), buried in Jalal Bakri
 Ahmad Saeed Kazmi (1913-1986), buried in Eid Gah, Multan 
Hazrat Qazi Hisamuddin Multani known as Qazi Jamaluddin Multani Badauni
 Peer Ali Mardan Awaisi (Tomb Located on Gali Peer Ali Mardan Akbar Road, Multan

Sports

The Multan Cricket Stadium has hosted many international cricket matches. Ibn-e-Qasim Bagh Stadium is the other stadium in Multan which is usually used for football along with other sports activities. Multan is home to the Multan Sultans, the franchise of Pakistan Super League founded in 2018. Multan Tigers, the domestic cricket team which had participated in domestic limited over tournaments was also based in the city. Multan and its division has produced many international cricketers like Inzamam-ul-Haq, Waqar Younis, Mushtaq Ahmed, Elahi Brothers, Mohammad Zahid, Sohaib Maqsood, Rahat Ali, Asmavia Iqbal and Sania Khan.

Notable people

Ahmad Shah Abdali (or Durrani) , founder of the Durrani Empire
Rukn-e-Alam, 13th/14th century Sufi and poet
Diwan Mulraj Chopra, Diwan of Multan
Yousaf Raza Gillani, politician and former Prime Minister of Pakistan 
Ghiyath al din Tughlaq, Governor of Multan and emperor of Indian subcontinent
Shah Mehmood Qureshi, politician and present Foreign Minister of Pakistan 
Khizr Khan, 15th century Emperor of Indian subcontinent
Javed Hashmi, politician
Malik Muhammad Rafique Rajwana, lawyer and politician
Malik Aamir Dogar, lawyer and politician
Fariduddin Ganjshakar, 12th-century Punjabi Muslim preacher and mystic
Inzamam-ul-Haq, former cricketer and captain
Saima Noor, actress
Mazhar Kaleem, writer
H. Gobind Khorana (Nobel Laureate)
Qandeel Baloch, (late) social media celebrity and model

Sister cities
 Rome, Italy
 Konya, Turkey
 Rasht, Iran
 Shihezi, China
 Ganja, Azerbaijan
 Xi'an, China (28 March 2019)

See also
 Climate of Multan
 City Wall of Multan
 Festivals in Multan
 History of Multan
 List of places in Multan
 Multan District
 Multan Division
 Multan Fort
 Multan International Airport
Multan City railway station
 Multan Museum
 Siege of Multan
 Battle of Multan
 Mausoleums of Multan
 Hindu temples in Multan
 List of educational institutions in Multan
 Mosques of Multan
Subah of Multan
Multan Sun Temple

Notes

References

External links

 
 Multan City government website 
 Britannica: Multan

 
 
Metropolitan areas of Pakistan
Sufism in Pakistan
Ismailism in Pakistan
Qarmatians